Ferry Stoffer (born 11 December 1985) is a Dutch Grand Prix motorcycle racer.

Career statistics

Grand Prix motorcycle racing

By season

Races by year

References

1985 births
Living people
Dutch motorcycle racers
125cc World Championship riders
21st-century Dutch people